1967–68 was the 21st season of the Western International Hockey League.

Standings
 Spokane Jets		     48		36	12	 0				251	162		.750
 Nelson Maple Leafs 	     44		26	18	 0				220	145		.591
 Kimberley Dynamiters	     44		22	22	 0				202	188		.500
 Trail Smoke Eaters	     44		17	27	 0				159	209		.386
 Cranbrook Royals	     44		11	33	 0				149	277		.250

Playoffs

Semi finals (best of 5)
 Spokane defeated Trail 3 games to 0 (7-0, 4-3, 10-4)
 Kimberley defeated Nelson 3 games to 0 (4-2, 4-3 2OT, 5-2)

Final (best of 7)
 Spokane defeated Kimberley 4 games to 1 (6-0, 6-0, 4-6, 5-2, 9-2)

The Spokane Jets advanced to the 1967-68 Western Canada Allan Cup Playoffs.

References 

Spokane Daily Chronicle - December 18, 1967
Spokane Daily Chronicle - December 19, 1967

Western International Hockey League seasons
WIHL
WIHL